Stanghelle Station is a railway station located at the village of Stanghelle in Vaksdal municipality in Vestland county, Norway. The station is served by twelve daily departures per direction by the Bergen Commuter Rail operated by Vy Tog. The station opened in 1883 as part of Vossebanen.

External links
 Stanghelle at the Norwegian National Rail Administration

Railway stations in Vaksdal
Railway stations on Bergensbanen
Railway stations opened in 1883